Richard the Lion-Hearted is a 1923 American silent historical adventure film directed by Chester Withey and starring Wallace Beery, Charles K. Gerrard and Kathleen Clifford. It is the sequel to Robin Hood (1922; starring Douglas Fairbanks in the titular role), with Beery returning as Richard the Lion-Hearted.  The film was written by Frank E. Woods and based on the 1825 Sir Walter Scott novel The Talisman.

Cast

Preservation
A print of Richard the Lion-Hearted is held at the Archives du Film du CNC in Bois d'Arcy.

References

External links

1923 films
American silent feature films
American black-and-white films
Films based on works by Walter Scott
Films directed by Chester Withey
1920s historical drama films
Cultural depictions of Richard I of England
American historical drama films
Films with screenplays by Frank E. Woods
American sequel films
1923 drama films
1920s American films
Silent American drama films